Mega Man Legacy Collection is a series of video game compilations based on Capcom's Mega Man franchise. Each compilation features several playable video games from one of the Mega Man sub-series and adds new gameplay features and bonus content such as concept artwork. These compilations were developed internally at Capcom and were released between 2015–2023 for Nintendo Switch, PlayStation 4, Windows, and Xbox One, with the exception of the original Legacy Collection which was developed by Digital Eclipse and also released on Nintendo 3DS.

The first  was released in 2015, followed by a second volume in 2017; together, they compile the first 10 numbered entries in the original Mega Man series. An upcoming compilation, is scheduled for a 2023 release and will include all six main games from the Mega Man Battle Network series, including both versions of later titles, for a total of 10 games split between two releases.

Mega Man Legacy Collection 
{{Infobox video game
| image = Mega Man Legacy Collection box art.jpg
| alt = Mega Man Legacy Collection cover
| caption = Cover art for the first Mega Man Legacy Collection
| developer = 
| publisher = Capcom
| released = Legacy CollectionLegacy Collection 2Nintendo Switch| genre = 2D action platformer
| modes = Single-player
| series = Mega Man
| engine = MT Framework (MMLC2)
| platforms = Nintendo 3DS (MMLC), Nintendo Switch, PlayStation 4, Windows, Xbox One
| title = Mega Man Legacy Collection 1 & 2
}}
The original Mega Man Legacy Collection was released on August 24, 2015 for Nintendo 3DS, PlayStation 4, Windows, and Xbox One. Developed by Digital Eclipse, it is a collection of the first six titles in the original Mega Man series, originally released for the Nintendo Entertainment System between 1987–1993.

A sequel, titled Mega Man Legacy Collection 2, was developed by Capcom and released on August 8, 2017 for PlayStation 4, Windows, and Xbox One. Legacy Collection 2 includes the 1995 Super Nintendo Entertainment System game Mega Man 7, the 1996 PlayStation game Mega Man 8, and the 2008 and 2010 PlayStation 3, Xbox 360 and Wii games Mega Man 9 and Mega Man 10. All of the downloadable content (DLC) released for Mega Man 9 and 10 is included, and can now be unlocked by completing each game or inputting a secret code on each game's title screen.

Both compilations were ported to the Nintendo Switch on May 22, 2018. A combined physical release for Switch, Mega Man Legacy Collection 1 + 2, includes a game card for Legacy Collection and a DLC code for downloading Legacy Collection 2, which is only available in digital format. The Switch version of Legacy Collection added a gameplay rewind feature to further assist novice players, which was later added to previous releases via a free update, excluding the 3DS version.

Players can choose between playing the Japanese "Rockman" versions and the international "Mega Man" versions of each game. Both collections feature a "Museum" mode that includes galleries of concept art and production images, as well as a music player for all the music tracks in the game. The Nintendo 3DS and Switch versions of the first collection feature an additional Museum section for the gallery known as "Antiques" that is not present in the other versions, which includes over 200 additional images, such as scans of original box art and pages of the Japanese version of the instruction manuals. A "Challenges" mode offers several time-based missions for players to attempt, such as completing a certain goal within a stage or defeating multiple bosses. Additional challenges can be unlocked in the 3DS and Switch compilations by using a Mega Man Amiibo. Legacy Collection also includes a Database mode similar to that of the earlier Rockman Complete Works releases, which lists character profiles. By highlighting a specific Robot Master in the Database (Legacy Collection 1) or Gallery (Legacy Collection 2), players can play a practice battle against that Robot Master.

 Mega Man X Legacy Collection

On December 4, 2017, during a Mega Man 30th Anniversary livestream hosted by Capcom, it was announced that all eight numbered entries in the Mega Man X franchise would be released for Nintendo Switch, PlayStation 4, Windows, and Xbox One. On April 10, 2018, as part of the Mega Man X 25th Anniversary celebration, it was revealed that the eight games would be split between two volumes. Mega Man X Legacy Collection contains Mega Man X–Mega Man X4, originally released between 1993–1997 for the SNES and PlayStation. Mega Man X Legacy Collection 2 contains Mega Man X5–Mega Man X8, originally released between 2000–2004 for the PlayStation and PlayStation 2. Both volumes were released simultaneously on July 24, 2018, including as a combined release under the name Mega Man X Legacy Collection 1 + 2. Like Legacy Collection 1 + 2, the physical combined release for Switch contains a cartridge for X Legacy Collection and a download code for X Legacy Collection 2; the PlayStation 4 and Xbox One versions contain two discs, one for each volume. The Japanese release followed two days later on July 26, with both games available individually in physical format on Switch. 

X Legacy Collection features the SNES version of X3, as opposed to the PlayStation port featured in 2006's Mega Man X Collection. Some modifications have been made to the individual games: the English names of the X5 Maverick bosses, which referenced the band Guns N' Roses in both the original release and 2006 collection, were changed in X Legacy Collection 2 into direct translations of their original Japanese names. X Legacy Collection 2 restores the Japanese voice tracks in the cutscenes of X6, which were omitted from the 2006 collection. Due to copyright reasons, the opening theme of X6 and ending themes of X6 and X7 have been replaced by new compositions in the international releases. The secret codes from the original releases of the PS1 titles and X8 return for this collection, with the buttons required for some of them being based on the controller of the system used.

Both volumes allow each game to be played in either their English or Japanese release, and contain several screen size and filtering options. A save feature is added for X–X3 , though the password system is also retained. An easier "Rookie Hunter" difficulty has been added to all eight titles, which halves damaged received; in games from X4 onward, Rookie Hunter also makes spikes less damaging and makes bottomless pits non-lethal. However, playing on Rookie Hunter difficulty locks the player out of earning some in-game achievements. A new gameplay mode, "X Challenge", allows the player to fight two Mavericks from X–X6 at once, with some of these battles exclusive to a single version. The collections also feature an extensive multimedia gallery including original trailers, merchandise images, concept art for all eight games, and the "Day of Sigma" animated short from Mega Man: Maverick Hunter X.

Mega Man Zero/ZX Legacy Collection

On August 27, 2019, it was confirmed that the next Legacy Collection release would contain all four games in the Mega Man Zero series, originally released between 2002–2005 for the Game Boy Advance, along with its Nintendo DS sequels Mega Man ZX (2006) and ZX Advent (2007), and would be titled Mega Man Zero/ZX Legacy Collection. It was originally planned for release on January 21, 2020 worldwide and January 23, 2020 in Japan for the Nintendo Switch, PlayStation 4, Windows, and Xbox One but it was delayed to February 25, 2020 worldwide and February 27, 2020 in Japan respectively.

Like the previous Legacy Collections, Zero/ZX Legacy Collection includes both the Japanese versions and the North American versions of each game. The gallery from the 2010 Mega Man Zero Collection is also included, along with several new features. Zero/ZX Legacy Collection adds an optional checkpoint system, which can be enabled to save the player's progress in each stage, along with a new "Casual Scenario" mode, which reduces the difficulty and adds additional assists. Another new mode, "Z Chaser", tasks players with finishing levels as quickly as possible. Additionally, a new "Link Mode" was added for ZX to recreate the original release's ability to connect to Zero 3 and Zero 4 via the DS's GBA slot; by choosing which game to link to before starting play, players can battle four additional bosses from each game, and the modification cards that were unlocked with the Nintendo e-Reader in the original Japanese release of Zero 3 are included which are unlocked in groups by completing certain achievements which are listed in the collection as "ZZ Cards". 

 Mega Man Battle Network Legacy Collection

On June 28, 2022 during a Nintendo Direct, Capcom announced Mega Man Battle Network Legacy Collection', set for release on April 14, 2023. The compilation will include all six main games from the Mega Man Battle Network series, released for the Game Boy Advance between 2001 and 2005. As Battle Network 3–6 each received two different versions when the games were originally released, both versions are included, bringing the total to 10 games. The game will be split into two volumes for the release; the first volume will include the first three Battle Network games, while the second will contain Battle Network 4–6. Both volumes will be released simultaneously on Nintendo Switch, PlayStation 4, and Windows, making this the first Legacy Collection to not release on Xbox One. A physical release containing both volumes will also be released for Nintendo Switch and PlayStation 4. 

The games in this collection are based on the original Japanese version, but with translations available for international releases to allow the usage of features previously exclusive to the Japanese version, including most of the crossover content based on Konami's Boktai series. The games in the collection are being updated to support competitive battling and battle chip trading via online multiplayer, as well as trading customizations from certain games. The collection will also include an art gallery, a music player, and additional screen-filtering options. In addition, battle records can be traded between games, and all 15 battle chips that were only distributed via Japanese events will be available via download. Other features include the ability to enable "patch cards" in 4–6'', 499 cards that could previously only be activated using the Nintendo e-Reader in the original release; and "Buster MAX mode", which multiplies MegaMan.EXE's attack power by 100 for simpler gameplay.

Reception

Notes

References

External links

Capcom video game compilations
Mega Man games
Nintendo 3DS games
Nintendo Switch games
PlayStation 4 games
Side-scrolling platform games
Single-player video games
Windows games
Xbox One games